Papulino is a rural locality (a selo) in Denyatinskoye Rural Settlement, Melenkovsky District, Vladimir Oblast, Russia. The population was 651 as of 2010. There are 6 streets.

Geography 
Papulino is located 29 km north of Melenki (the district's administrative centre) by road. Rozhdestveno is the nearest rural locality.

References 

Rural localities in Melenkovsky District
Melenkovsky Uyezd